A magic sword is any kind of mythological or fictional sword imbued with magical power.

Magic sword may also refer to:

 Magic Sword (video game), 1990 side-scrolling fantasy arcade game 
 The Magic Sword (1901 film), a British short silent fantasy film
 The Magic Sword (1950 film), a Yugoslav fantasy film, based on Serbian folk tales
 The Magic Sword (1962 film), an American fantasy film, loosely adapted from the St. George legend
 Quest for Camelot, titled The Magic Sword: Quest for Camelot in United Kingdom
 Magic Sword (band), three-piece American synthwave band from Boise, Idaho